Stanford Sherman was born in Akron, Ohio and is an American film and television writer best known for such productions as Any Which Way You Can, Krull, Ice Pirates, The Man From U.N.C.L.E. and Batman.

References

External links

American male screenwriters
American television writers
Living people
American male television writers
Year of birth uncertain
Year of birth missing (living people)